Lukas Zumsteg (born 21 June 1972) is a Swiss former professional road cyclist. He most notably won the Tour de Berne in 2000.

Major results
1999
 8th Overall UNIQA Classic
2000
 1st Tour de Berne
2001
 2nd Josef Voegeli Memorial
 8th GP du canton d'Argovie
2002
 5th Road race, National Road Championships

References

External links

1972 births
Living people
Swiss male cyclists